The Zanzibar barb (Enteromius zanzibaricus) is a species of cyprinid fish.

It is found along the coast of east Africa from Somaliland to Mozambique.
Its natural habitats are rivers and freshwater lakes. It is not considered a threatened species by the IUCN.

References

Enteromius
Cyprinid fish of Africa
Fish described in 1868
Taxa named by Wilhelm Peters
Taxonomy articles created by Polbot